Azanus urios, the Siam babul blue, is a small butterfly found in India and Thailand that belongs to the lycaenids or blues family.

See also
List of butterflies of India
List of butterflies of India (Lycaenidae)

References

 
  
 
 
 
 

Azanus
Butterflies of Asia